The Hawking Brothers were an Australian country music band, formed in 1955 and disbanded in 1985. They initially started as a duo by the brothers Russell (1931–1976) and Alan (1933–1988). For the five-piece version, the Hawking Brothers & the Wildwoods, they were joined by Joe Attard, Gary Newton, and George Xanthos. Later they reverted to the Hawking Brothers with other members including Peter Hayes and Doug Foley. The group reached the top 40 on the Kent Music Report singles chart with "Catfish John" (1973) and "One Day at a Time" (1978). They played at the Grand Ole Opry in 1975. The Hawking Brothers have won eight Golden Guitar trophies at the Country Music Awards of Australia. In 1989 the Hawking Brothers were inducted into the Australian Roll of Renown.

History 

Alan (7 July 1933–19 September 1988) and his older brother, Russell John Hawking (1 July 1931–2 November 1976), were both born in Mooroopna in northern Victoria. After their mother, Ethel May Hawking (c. 1912–1935), died they were raised separately: Alan in Clifton Hill, Victoria by their maternal grandparents; Russell in Mooroopna by their paternal grandparents. During the late 1940s Alan and Russell attended the Hillbilly Club in Brunswick for basic instruction in country music. The Hawking Brothers performed as a "hillbilly duo" and competed for an Amateur Hour prize of £1000 in October 1952 and finished third. The brothers also joined the Trailblazers, a country music troupe, which performed on radio and toured Victoria in the 1950s. They were recorded on the album, The Trailblazers Stage Show (1958) for Planet Records.

The Hawking Brothers, with Alan on lead guitar and vocals and Russell on rhythm guitar and vocals, issued a single, "My Darling Daisy", on Regal Zonophone Records, in June 1955. In the following year Alan married Diane and the couple later had four children. Another single, "Please, Baby, Please", which was co-written by Alan and Russell, appeared in November 1960 via Columbia Records. Ainslie Baker of The Australian Women's Weekly felt it was, "catchy, and shows plenty of promise for the future." When not performing Alan worked as a cabinetmaker and then as a luthier at Maton, Russell was a public servant. The duo backed the country music singer Kevin Shegog and were recorded on the albums, Country Concert (split album, 1961) and Kevin Shegog (solo album, 1962), both on W&G Records. In April 1962 the Hawking Brothers released another single, "Two Timin' Baby".

In November 1967 they issued their debut stand-alone album, Portrait of the Folksy, via W&G Records. The Wildwoods were the backing musicians for an album, The Hawking Brothers and The Wildwoods (1970), which was issued by Parlophone/EMI Music Australia. The line-up was Alan on guitar, banjo, autoharp and vocals; and Russ on rhythm guitar, dobro, and vocals as the Hawking Brothers; while the Wildwoods were Joe Attard on drums; Gary Newton on acoustic and electric bass guitars; and George Xanthos on pedal steel guitar. It was recorded at Armstrong Studios with Roger Savage and John Sayers as audio engineers. Eventually they became the five-piece version of the Hawking Brothers Band. The group signed with Fable Records to release the album, Australian Heritage (1970). They had quit their daytime jobs and became fully professional.

In 1973 the Hawking Brothers backed Johnny Cash on his Australian tour. They released a cover version of "Catfish John" in that year, originally by United States country singer-songwriter, Bob McDill. Their rendition reached the top 40 on the Kent Music Report singles chart. It appeared on the group's compilation album for Fable Records, Country Gold (1973). The line-up was Alan on vocal, spanish guitar, tenor guitar, banjo, and auto harp; Russ on vocal, rhythm guitar and Dobro guitar; Newton on bass guitar; Xanthos on pedal steel guitar; and Peter Cohen on drums.

Russell died in 1976 after a heart attack. Alan continued the group, in homage to his brother, with Peter Hayes joining on guitar and vocals. Their cover version of Marilyn Sellars' 1974 single, "One Day at a Time", reached the No. 30 in 1978. By 1980 Alan and Xanthos had been joined by Leo Dalton, John Faubles and Doug Foley. Due to "personal reasons" Alan retired from the group in 1981 and undertook a solo career. Alan died in 1988 due to "complications set in after a gall-bladder operation."

Discography

Studio albums

{| class="wikitable plainrowheaders" style="text-align:center;" border="1"
|+ List of albums, with selected chart positions
! scope="col" rowspan="2" style="width:20em;" | Title
! scope="col" rowspan="2" style="width:16em;" | Album details
! scope="col" colspan="1" | Peak chartpositions
|-
! scope="col" style="text-align:center;" | AUS
|-
! scope="row" | Country Concert 
|
 Released: 1961
 Format: LP
 Label: W&G Records 
| align="center" | - 
|-
! scope="row" | Portrait of the Folksy  The Hawking Brothers Sing Old Golden Songs
|
 Released: November 1967
 Format: LP
 Label: W&G 
| align="center" | - 
|-
! scope="row" | Australian Heritage
|
 Released: 1970
 Format: LP
 Label: Fable Records 
| align="center" | - 
|-
! scope="row" | Australian Heritage, Vol. 2
|
 Released: 1975
 Format: LP
 Label: Fable 
| align="center" | - 
|-
! scope="row" | The Hawking Brothers in Nashville
|
 Released: 1976
 Format: LP
 Label: Fable 
| align="center" | - 
|-
! scope="row" | Country Travellin'''
|
 Released: 1977
 Format: LP
 Label: RCA Victor 
| align="center" | - 
|-
! scope="row" | One Day at a Time|
 Released: December 1978
 Format: LP
 Label: RCA Victor 
| align="center" | 56 
|-
! scope="row" | Songs & Poems of Australia 
|
 Released: 1979
 Format: LP
 Label: RCA Victor 
| align="center" | - 
|-
! scope="row" | The Hawks|
 Released: 1979
 Format: LP
 Label: RCA Victor 
| align="center" | - 
|}

Live albums

Compilations

Charting singles

Other singles 

Awards

Country Music Awards (CMAA)

The Australasian Country Music Awards were established as an annual ceremony on the Australia Day long-weekend in Tamworth since January 1973. The Hawking Brothers have won eight Golden Guitar trophies, while Alan Hawking won an additional three for his solo work. The group were inducted into the Roll of Renown at the 1989 ceremony. In 1992 the awards were rebranded as the Country Music Awards of Australia when they were presented by the Country Music Association of Australia (CMAA).

|-
| rowspan="2"|1974 || The Hawking Brothers – "Yakity Axe" || Instrumental of the Year || 
|-
| The Hawking Brothers – "Catfish John" || Vocal Group or Duo of the Year || 
|-
| 1975 ||  The Hawking Brothers – "Juliana" || Vocal Group or Duo of the Year || 
|-
| 1977 ||  The Hawking Brothers – "This House Runs on Sunshine" || Vocal Group or Duo of the Year || 
|-
| rowspan="2"|1978 || The Hawking Brothers – Country Travellin || Album of the Year || 
|-
| The Hawking Brothers – "Silver Wings" || Vocal Group or Duo of the Year || 
|-
| rowspan="2"|1979 || The Hawking Brothers – One Day at a Time || Top Selling Album || 
|-
| The Hawking Brothers – One Day at a Time'' || Album of the Year || 
|-
| 1983 || Alan Hawking – "Back to Those Rolling Plains " || Instrumental of the Year || 
|-
| 1985 || Alan Hawking – "Gospel Train" || Instrumental of the Year || 
|-
| 1988 || Alan Hawking – "The Old Time Tent Shows" (Barry Forrester) || APRA Song of the Year || 
|-
| 1989 || Themselves || Roll of Renown|| 
|-

 Note: Wins only

See also
Smoky Dawson
Slim Dusty
Chad Morgan

References

External links
http://www.ozziemusicman.com/2009/11/post-187-hawking-brothers-melbourne-cup.html
One Day at a Time

Australian country music groups
Musicians from Victoria (Australia)